James McCormick (15 October 1923 – 8 December 2006) was a New Zealand rugby union player. He was a member of the New Zealand national side, the All Blacks, on their 1947 tour of Australia. He played three matches on that tour but did not appear in any internationals.

References

1923 births
2006 deaths
People from Waipukurau
People educated at Scots College, Wellington
New Zealand rugby union players
New Zealand international rugby union players
Wairarapa rugby union players
Hawke's Bay rugby union players
Rugby union hookers
Rugby union players from the Wellington Region
Rugby union players from the Hawke's Bay Region